The Yakoun River is the largest river on Haida Gwaii, off the North Coast of British Columbia, Canada. Estimated to be  in length,  it is located on Graham Island, the northernmost and largest of the archipelago, and runs in a twisting course generally northwards from Yakoun Lake, which lies near the island's south-central region, just northwards over Slatechuck Mountain from Skidegate Inlet, entering saltwater at Masset Inlet, a large saltwater bay located in the heart of the island.

The Yakoun was the location - until its destruction - of Kiidk'yaas, a unique gold-coloured sitka spruce.

References
BC Names/GeoBC entry "Yakoun River"

Rivers of Haida Gwaii